San Marcos is a town in Antioquia department in Colombia. It is approximately 175 miles (282 km) north of Medellín, in the heart of Colombia's coffee-growing region.

The symbol for its airport is SRS.

Populated places in the Antioquia Department